T. J. Clark may refer to:

T. J. Clark (art historian) (born 1943), British art historian
T. J. Clark (racing driver) (born 1962), American NASCAR driver
Terrance John Clark (1944–1983), head of the Mr. Asia drug syndicate
Timothy J. Clark (artist) (born 1951), American painter
Thomas J. Clark (1869–1907), American inventor